Conrad Sebastian Robert Russell, 5th Earl Russell,  (15 April 1937 – 14 October 2004), was a British historian and politician. His parents were the philosopher and mathematician Bertrand Russell and his third wife Patricia Russell. He was also a great-grandson of the 19th-century British Whig Prime Minister Lord John Russell. He succeeded to the earldom on the death of his half-brother, John Russell, on 16 December 1987.  Both sons were named after their father's great friend Joseph Conrad, who was also the 4th Earl's godfather. 

Educated at Eton (King's Scholar) and Merton College, Oxford, Conrad Russell was an academic historian working on 17th-century British history, having extensively written and lectured on parliamentary struggles of the period. Russell was also a passionate advocate of liberalism, from a long family line of distinguished liberals.

After his death from complications of emphysema, Russell was succeeded as Earl by his elder son, Nicholas, who died in 2014 and was succeeded as Earl by his brother, John, who is also a politician.

Academic career
Russell was a historian working on the origins of the English Civil War and critical of older Whig and Marxist interpretations. His major works include Crisis of Parliaments: English history 1509–1660 (1971), Origins of the English Civil War (edited, 1973), Parliaments and English politics, 1621–1629 (1979), Unrevolutionary England, 1603–1642 (1990), and Fall of the British monarchies, 1637–1642 (1991). His work on early Stuart Parliaments was profoundly influenced by the work of Alan Everitt, who had argued that the English gentry were preoccupied with defending their positions in the localities rather than responding to the demands of the Crown. This no longer seems entirely plausible in the light of the work done by Richard Cust, Clive Holmes, Peter Lake and Christopher Thompson. Russell argued that the Civil War was much less a result of long term constitutional conflicts than had previously been thought, e.g. by Lawrence Stone and Christopher Hill, and that its origins are to be sought rather in the years immediately preceding the outbreak of war in 1642 and in the context of the problems of the multiple kingdoms of the British Isles, a hypothesis for which he was indebted to the pioneering study of Helmut Koenigsberger. This area is still being explored by historians like John Adamson and David Scott even if their detailed conclusions vary from those reached by Russell.

He was lecturer (and later reader) in history at Bedford College, University of London (now part of Royal Holloway), 1960–1979; professor of history at Yale University, US, 1979–1984; Astor Professor of British History at University College London, 1984–1990; and professor of British history at King's College London from 1990 to his retirement in 2003. Russell's expectation that he would succeed Michael Howard as Regius Professor of History at the University of Oxford was unfulfilled, partly because of doubts long-held in the university about his scholarship and partly because his political partisanship made him unacceptable for such a prestigious post.

Political career
As a young man, Russell's political allegiance varied between the Labour Party and the then weak Liberal Party. He stood as the Labour candidate in Paddington South in the 1966 general election, but failed to win the seat from the Conservatives.

He succeeded to the title of Earl Russell on the death of his half-brother, John Russell, in 1987. He was the first parliamentarian to take his seat as a Liberal Democrat, shortly after the party was formed in 1988 from a merger of the Liberal Party and the Social Democratic Party.

In 1999, all but 92 hereditary peers were removed from the House of Lords. Lord Russell was elected at the top of his party's list of hereditary peers to retain their seats, though he had consistently argued in favour of abolishing the Lords completely, and replacing it with an elected senate. He was admired in the House for his fund of historical anecdotes and dry sense of humour.

He was vice-president of the Liberal Democrat Youth and Students 1993–1994 and honorary president of the Liberal Democrat History Group 1998–2004. In 1988 he became Co-Chairman (later President) of the Council for Academic Autonomy, a group of university academics promoting the principles of academic freedom and the independence of universities from state and commercial control, and was instrumental in a crucial amendment to the Education Reform Act of 1988.

Death
Russell's health worsened in the late 1990s and he died of respiratory failure at Central Middlesex Hospital in 2004. Russell was predeceased by his wife in 2003.

Published books
The Crisis of Parliaments: English History 1509–1660 (1971)
The Origins of the English Civil War (1973)
Parliaments and English Politics, 1621–1629 (1979)
Unrevolutionary England:1603-1642 (1990)
The Causes of the English Civil War (1990)
The Fall of the British Monarchies, 1637–1642 (1991)
Academic Freedom (1993)
An Intelligent Person's Guide to Liberalism (1999)

In his book Academic Freedom, Russell examines the ideal and the limits of academic freedom, and the relations between the university and the state.  He notes (p. 24) that his father's career is a reminder that a free society is not a guarantee against losing an academic job for holding very unpopular opinions on non-academic subjects, as Bertrand Russell in fact did twice.

References

Sources

External links

biog - Conrad Russell

1937 births
2004 deaths
Academics of King's College London
Academics of Royal Holloway, University of London
Academics of University College London
Alumni of Merton College, Oxford
British humanists
Deaths from emphysema
Earls Russell
Labour Party (UK) parliamentary candidates
Liberal Democrats (UK) hereditary peers
People educated at Eton College
Conrad
Yale University faculty
20th-century British historians
People from Harting
Hereditary peers elected under the House of Lords Act 1999